In 1913 and 1914, Portugal issued postage stamps specifically for Tete Province, now part of Mozambique.

Background
The 1913 stamps were those of the Vasco da Gama issue of 1898, overprinted "REPUBLICA / TETE" and a new denomination in centavos. Each of the eight values from Macau, Portuguese Africa and Timor were overprinted, yielding a total of 24 stamps. In 1914, the omnibus Ceres issue of Portugal included 16 values for Tete, ranging from 1/4 centavo to one escudo. Subsequently, Tete reverted to using the stamps of Mozambique. Although these stamps are not rare, none costing the collector over about US$10, genuinely-used examples are harder to find, and command a premium of about 50-100% over unused.

See also
 Postage stamps and postal history of Mozambique

References

Bibliography
 Cross, John K. "Quelimane & Tete: Not Quite on the Q. T." Portuguese Philatelic Society Bulletin. Nos. 102–104. (Feb 1987-Aug. 1989).

External links
 AskPhil – Glossary of Stamp Collecting Terms
 Encyclopaedia of Postal Authorities

Tete
Philately of Portugal
Philately of Mozambique